Sweet Temptation may refer to:

Sweet Temptation (film)
Sweet Temptation (Hollow), song